Jean Marie Emmanuel Froget (born 17 June 1993) is a Mauritian swimmer.

Career
Froget first competed for Mauritius at the 2009 World Championships in Rome where he finished 84th in the 400 metre freestyle in 4:26.48, 85th in the 200 metre individual medley in 2:21.32, 70th in the 200 metre butterfly in 2:16.82, 121st in the 200 metre freestyle in 2:05.47 and 162nd in the 50 metre butterfly in 27.83. In the relays, Froget teamed up with Ronny Vencatachellum, Mathieu Marquet and Jean Hugues Gregoire to finish 36th in the 4 × 100 metre freestyle relay. In the 4 × 100 metre medley relay, Froget with Vencatachellum, Hugues Gregoire and Kevin Cheung were disqualified.

At the 2010 Summer Youth Olympics in Singapore he finished 41st in the 200 metre freestyle in 2:02.98.

He is currently the vice president of the Mauritius Swimming Federation.

References

1993 births
Living people
Mauritian male swimmers
Male butterfly swimmers
Mauritian male freestyle swimmers
Male medley swimmers
Place of birth missing (living people)
Swimmers at the 2010 Summer Youth Olympics